Zhuocao Township is a township in Shaodong, Hunan, China. It is known for Chinese herbal medicine and has been hailed as "Medicine town in central Hunan".

History
In 1950 it belonged to Lianqiao District. It was renamed "Zhuocao People's Commune" in 1958. It was incorporated as a township in 1984.

Administrative division
As of 2017, the township is divided into twenty-nine villages: 
Shangzhuo
Shiping
Xinpu
Yaojia
Luofu
Shizi
Xinkui
Shaping
Tanshu
Zishan
Ma'antang
Huangni'ao
Yanquan
Mukouba
Hetangping
Ditang
Wanfu
Hutiantang
Chongshan
Ouping
Lijia
Yejiping
Tangjialing
Longtan
Changliu
Caidaping
Zaitang
Yuanjia
Wutong

Geography

Luoshuiyan Reservoir is a reservoir in the township. The lake provides drinking water and water for irrigation.

Economy
The local economy is primarily based upon Chinese herbal medicine and fruits.

Attractions
Three public parks are located in the township: Yanquan Park, Liu'an Park and Xiashan Park.

References

Divisions of Shaodong